is a professional Go player.

Biography
Hideki Matsuoka became a professional in 1987. In 1998 he was promoted to 8 dan. He was runner up in 2001 for the 42nd Okan. He won the 47th Okan in 2006, his first title. He won his 400th career game in 2003.

Titles & runners-up

References

External links
 Nihon Ki-in profile 

1968 births
Japanese Go players
Living people
People from Ichinomiya, Aichi